Temoq can refer to:
 Temoq people, an Orang Asli group of people from Peninsula Malaysia.
 Temoq language, the language spoken by the Temoq people.